Jelena Janković was the defending champion, but chose not to participate that year.

Flavia Pennetta defeated Carla Suárez Navarro 6–2, 4–6, 6–3 to win the 2010 title.

This is notable for being the first main draw appearance of future world No. 1 and Grand Slam champion Simona Halep where she lost in the quarterfinals to Flavia Pennetta.

Seeds

Draw

Finals

Top half

Bottom half

External links
Draw and Qualifying Draw

Singles